Cécile Coulon (born 13 June 1990) is a French novelist, poet and short story writer. As of 2020, she has published seven novels, two poetry collections and one short story collection. She has been awarded the Prix des libraires (2017) and the prix Guillaume Apollinaire (2018)

Early life and education
Coulon was born on 13 June 1990 in Saint-Saturnin, Puy-de-Dôme. She wrote her first novel at age 16, while she was still a student. Coulon passed the baccalauréat, with the cinema option. After taking a Hypokhâgne and a Khâgne course, she pursued studies in Modern Literature at Blaise Pascal University in Clermont-Ferrand.

Career
In 2007, Coulon's first novel, entitled Le Voleur de vie, was published by Éditions Revoir.

In 2010, her second novel Méfiez-vous des enfants sages was published by Éditions Viviane Hamy.

In 2012, her third novel Le roi n'a pas sommeil was published by Éditions Viviane Hamy. It also won the Prix Coup de foudre at Vendanges Littéraires in Rivesaltes. It was also a finalist for the prix France Culture-Télérama at the Salon du Livre de Paris. In 2014, Le roi n'a pas sommeil was a finalist for the Prix du Meilleur Roman des lecteurs de Points, a literary award from newspaper Le Point.

In 2013, her fourth novel Le Rire du grand blessé was published by Éditions Viviane Hamy. It was a finalist for the 2015 Prix littéraire des jeunes Européens. Coulon was the president of the jury of the 2013 .

In 2015, Coulon's fifth novel Le Cœur du pélican was published by Éditions Viviane Hamy. As of 2016, Coulon is completing a thesis on the link between literature and sport.

In 2017, her sixth novel, Trois saisons d'orage, was published by Éditions Viviane Hamy. It was awarded the 2017 Prix des libraires.

In 2017, Coulon collaborated with video game studio Small Bang. She adapted Homer's epic poem, the Iliad, into a storyline for their video game Diorama.

In 2018, Coulon's first poetry collection, Les Ronces, was published by Le Castor Astral. Les Ronces was awarded the 2018 prix Guillaume Apollinaire. It was also awarded the prix Révélation de poésie from the Société des gens de lettres.

In March 2018, Coulon participated in the 7th edition of the Paris des Femmes theatre festival at the théâtre des Mathurins in Paris. Coulon's play, titled On se remet de tout, was a one-woman show performed by Bénédicte Choisnet.

In May 2018, Coulon sent a letter to open the debates at the Etats Généraux du Livre. The letter was read by fellow writer Carole Zalberg. In it, Coulon humorously criticizes the pauperization of authors in France and warns of the catastrophic effects of the announced increase in the contribution sociale généralisée (CSG) on their relatively low income, without affording them any new social rights. At the time, Coulon was on a jury at the Centre national du cinéma et de l'image animée (CNC), a jury which awards grants for video games that are in production.

In 2019, Coulon's seventh novel Une bête au paradis was published by Éditions de l'Iconoclaste. It was awarded the 2019 . The novel centers around the life of an orphan taken in by her peasant grandmother.

Works

Novels

Short story collection

Poetry

Theatre

Awards and honors
 Winner – 2012 Prix Coup de foudre at Vendanges Littéraires for Le roi n'a pas sommeil
 Winner – 2012  (Fiction) for Le roi n'a pas sommeil
 Finalist – 2012 Prix France Culture-Télérama for Le roi n'a pas sommeil
 Finalist – 2012 Franz-Hessel-Preis for Le roi n'a pas sommeil
 Finalist – 2014 Prix du Meilleur roman des lecteurs de Points for Le roi n'a pas sommeil
 Finalist – 2015 Prix littéraire des jeunes Européens for Le Rire du grand blessé
 Finalist – 2017 Prix du Livre Inter for Trois saisons d'orage
 Winner – 2017 Prix des libraires for Trois saisons d'orage
 Winner – 2018 Prix SGDL révélation de poésie for Les Ronces
 Winner – 2018 Prix Guillaume Apollinaire for Les Ronces
 Winner – 2019  for Une bête au paradis

References

1990 births
Living people
21st-century French novelists
21st-century French women writers
French women novelists
21st-century French poets
French women poets
Writers from Clermont-Ferrand
Prix Guillaume Apollinaire winners
Prix des libraires winners